Frauenau is a municipality in the district of Regen, in Bavaria, Germany. It is known for its artificial lake, which is used as a water supply of the area around Deggendorf and Passau.

References

Regen (district)
Bavarian Forest